The Scottish Cup is the national ice hockey cup in Scotland. It has been held since 1997.

Champions

Scottish Cup
1997 : Paisley Pirates
1998 : Fife Flyers
1999 : Fife Flyers
2000 : Fife Flyers
2001 : Fife Flyers
2002 : Edinburgh Capitals 2
2003 : Camperdown
2004 : Dumfries
2005 : Paisley Pirates
2006 : Fife Flyers
2007 : Fife Flyers
2008 : Dundee Rockets
2009 : Fife Flyers
2010 : Fife Flyers

Scottish Autumn Cup
2001 : Edinburgh Capitals 2
2002 : Edinburgh Capitals 2
2003 : Paisley Pirates
2004 : Camperdown
2005 : Solway Sharks
2006 : Fife Flyers
2007 : Fife Flyers
2008 : Dundee Stars
2009 : Fife Flyers
2010 : Dundee Stars

Scottish Spring Cup
2001 : Edinburgh Capitals
2002 : Edinburgh Capitals 2
2003 : Edinburgh Capitals 2
2004 : Dumfries
2005 : Edinburgh Capitals 2
2006 : Solway Sharks

External links
 Scottish Ice Hockey Association

National ice hockey cup competitions in Europe
Ice hockey competitions in Scotland